Cibotium taiwanense is a species of fern in the genus Cibotium, endemic to Taiwan.   Some sources regard it as the same species as Cibotium cumingii.

References

taiwanense
Flora of Taiwan